Haunted Gold is a 1932 Pre-Production Code, American Western film directed by Mack V. Wright and starring John Wayne. It is a remake of the 1928 film The Phantom City, starring Ken Maynard and his horse Tarzan. Filmed in 1932, two years before the implementation of Hollywood's Production Code, the film contains several racial slurs involving the black character "Clarence Brown" (played by Blue Washington).

Plot
John Mason and Janet Carter receive an anonymous letter telling them to travel to a ghost town that has an abandoned mine. There they befriend each other as they try to find out why they were sent the letters. They soon find themselves targets of Joe Ryan and his gang who are looking for the hidden gold inside the abandoned mine. They are helped by the mysterious Phantom of the mine who has his own plans.

Cast
 John Wayne as John Mason
 Sheila Terry as Janet Carter
 Harry Woods as Joe Ryan
 Erville Alderson as Tom Benedict
 Otto Hoffman as Simon - Benedict's Servant
 Martha Mattox as Mrs. Herman
 Blue Washington as Clarence Washington Brown
John T. Prince as Bill Carter
 Duke as Duke - John Wayne's Horse

See also
 John Wayne filmography

References

External links
 
 
 
 

1932 films
1932 Western (genre) films
American Western (genre) films
American black-and-white films
Remakes of American films
Films set in ghost towns
Films directed by Mack V. Wright
Warner Bros. films
1930s English-language films
1930s American films